Farhana Qamar Abbasi is a former politician who had been a member of the National Assembly of Pakistan, from June 2013 to May 2018.

Political career

She was elected to the National Assembly of Pakistan as a candidate of Pakistan Muslim League (N) on a reserved seat for women from Punjab in 2013 Pakistani general election. In October 2017, she was appointed as Federal Parliamentary Secretary for National Health Services.

In 2018, she left the PML-N.

References

Living people
Pakistan Muslim League (N) MNAs
Pakistani MNAs 2013–2018
Women members of the National Assembly of Pakistan
Pakistani emigrants to the United Kingdom
Naturalised citizens of the United Kingdom
1966 births
21st-century Pakistani women politicians